Thomas De Gendt (born 6 November 1986) is a Belgian professional road racing cyclist, who rides for UCI WorldTeam .

Career

Born in Sint-Niklaas, De Gendt won the opening stage of the 2011 Paris–Nice and also won stage 7 of the 2011 Tour de Suisse. At the 2011 Tour de France, despite suffering a minor collarbone fracture, De Gendt had a strong final week, finishing sixth on stage 19 to Alpe d'Huez and fourth in the time trial the following day.

In 2012, De Gendt won stage 7 of Paris–Nice after a breakaway with Rein Taaramäe. In the Giro d'Italia he won the penultimate stage at the Stelvio Pass with a solo breakaway which brought him to fourth in the general classification. The following day he advanced to finish third in the final classification to take his first grand tour podium after passing Michele Scarponi in the final Time Trial.

In October 2013,  announced that they were signing De Gendt for the 2014 season after the  outfit folded. At the 2016 Tour de France, he won stage 12 which finished at Mont Ventoux. At the 2017 Vuelta a España, De Gendt won stage 19 from a breakaway, completing his set of stage wins in all three Grand Tours.

In 2018, De Gendt won Stage 3 of the Volta a Catalunya from a break, as is his habit. He added to his string of long breakaway victories by winning the second stage of the Tour de Romandie in solo fashion.

In 2019, he won stage 8 of the Tour de France in spectacular fashion -- staying in the lead (as part of a 3-, 4-, and later 2-man breakaway for most of it) for all 200 km. On the final climb, yellow jersey contenders Julian Alaphilippe and Thibaut Pinot tried to take it away from de Gendt with a break of their own, but couldn't catch up to him, ultimately conceding the stage by 6 seconds.

Major results

2006
 1st  Mountains classification, Thüringen Rundfahrt der U23
 9th Grand Prix de Waregem
2007
 1st Stage 3 Thüringen Rundfahrt der U23
2008
 1st  Overall Le Triptyque des Monts et Châteaux
1st Stage 1
 1st Grand Prix de Waregem
 3rd Circuit de Wallonie
 5th Overall Vuelta a Navarra
1st Stage 4
2009
 1st Internationale Wielertrofee Jong Maar Moedig
 Tour of Britain
1st  Mountains classification
1st  Sprints classification
 4th GP Triberg-Schwarzwald
 10th Overall Tour de Wallonie
1st Stage 4
 10th Overall Bayern–Rundfahrt
2010
 1st  Sprints classification, Volta ao Algarve
 2nd Brabantse Pijl
 3rd Overall Ster Elektrotoer
 4th Overall Étoile de Bessèges
 5th Overall Tour of Belgium
2011
 1st Stage 1 Paris–Nice
 1st Stage 7 Tour de Suisse
 2nd Overall Circuit de Lorraine
1st Stage 3
 9th Overall Volta ao Algarve
 9th Chrono des Nations
2012
 1st Stage 7 Paris–Nice
 3rd Overall Giro d'Italia
1st Stage 20
 3rd Amstel Curaçao Race
2013
 1st Stage 7 Volta a Catalunya
2015
 1st  Mountains classification, Paris–Nice
 1st  Mountains classification, Tour de Suisse
  Combativity award Stage 13 Tour de France
2016
 Tour de France
1st Stage 12
Held  after Stages 5–7, 12–14
 Combativity award Stages 5 & 12
 Volta a Catalunya
1st  Mountains classification
1st  Sprints classification
1st Stage 4
 Vuelta a España
Held  after Stage 9
 Combativity award Stage 4
2017
 Vuelta a España
1st Stage 19
 Combativity award Stage 13
 1st  Mountains classification, Tour Down Under
 1st Stage 1 Critérium du Dauphiné
 4th Time trial, National Road Championships
  Combativity award Stage 14 Tour de France
2018
 Vuelta a España
1st  Mountains classification
 Combativity award Stage 12
 Tour de Romandie
1st  Points classification
1st  Mountains classification
1st Stage 2
 1st  Mountains classification, Paris–Nice
 1st Stage 3 Volta a Catalunya
 2nd Time trial, National Road Championships
2019
 Tour de France
1st Stage 8
 Combativity award Stage 8
 Volta a Catalunya
1st  Mountains classification
1st Stage 1
 1st  Mountains classification, Paris–Nice
2020
 4th Time trial, National Road Championships
2021
 1st Stage 7 Volta a Catalunya
2022
 1st Stage 8 Giro d'Italia

Grand Tour general classification results timeline

Notes

References

External links

1986 births
Living people
Sportspeople from Sint-Niklaas
Cyclists from East Flanders
Belgian male cyclists
Belgian Giro d'Italia stage winners
Tour de Suisse stage winners
Belgian Tour de France stage winners
Belgian Vuelta a España stage winners